Kras may refer to:

 Karst Plateau, known in Slovene as Kras, a limestone borderline plateau region in southwestern Slovenia
 KRAS - a protein V-Ki-ras2 Kirsten rat sarcoma viral oncogene homolog
 Kras Stadion, a stadium in Volendam, Netherlands
 , a village near Buzet, Istria County, Croatia
 , a village on near Dobrinj, Primorje-Gorski Kotar County, Croatia
 Kraš, Croatian food company
 Kraš (surname)